Netball is one of the most popular women's participation sports in South Africa. The sport is also played by a large number of men. It exists in a culture where sport plays an important public and social part of life. The history of South Africa's netball involvement mirrors that of other sports played in the country like rugby union.  During the apartheid era, there were many netball facilities available for whites to use, and fewer for people from other race groups. Funding issues and gender issues did not help bridge this gap.

South Africa has been a long time participant in the international netball community. It was part of the 1960 meeting to set the rules for the game. It came in third place at the 1967 World Netball Championship. Around 1970, during the Sporting boycott of South Africa, South Africa was blocked from competing internationally. South Africa was welcomed back to have their teams compete in international games in the 1990s. This came with national accusations of race playing a part in squad selection. Netball South Africa has worked to help develop the sport in the region in countries like Botswana.

Brutal Fruit Netball Cup

On 16 April 2014, Netball South Africa announced the launch of the first ever semi-professional netball league in South Africa, as well as in Africa. The partnership with naming sponsor Brutal Fruit will run for five years, until 2019. The Brutal Fruit Netball Cup adds a new dimension to women's sport in South Africa and becomes Netball's premier domestic competition incorporating 10 teams from all 9 provinces. The Netball Cup runs over five weeks and pits the five best provincial teams against each other in Division 1, and the rest of the teams in Division 2 within a relegation and promotion system. The first competition ran from 10 May 2014 to 7 June 2014. All matches were held in the Rembrandt Hall at the University of Pretoria. All matches were broadcast live on SuperSport.

Netball South Africa
Netball South Africa is the peak governing body for the sport of netball in South Africa. The head office is located in Pretoria. As of November 2017, the executive committee is as follows:
 President - Cecilia Molokwane
 Vice President - Christine Du Preez
CEO - Blanche de la Guerre
Director of Selections - Nompumelelo Javu
Director of Umpires - Annie Klopper
Director of Demarcation and Structures - Mami Diale
Director of Coaches - Anneline Lewies

Participation
Netball is a very popular women's sport in South Africa. While participation rates are high, there is no sense of collective identity by players as netballers and being part of a national netball community. In 2002, 40% of African girls rated netball as their favourite sport and 19% of coloured girls like netball best. Many African girls claim netball as their favourite sport even if they have never played it.

History

The history of South Africa's netball involvement mirrors that of other sports played in the country like the rugby union. South Africa was involved with the international netball community early in the sport's history, taking part in the 1960 meeting of Commonwealth countries in Sri Lanka to standardise the rules for the game. South Africa's international involvement was suspended because of apartheid era policies. In 1969, South Africa was expelled from competing internationally in netball. When they rejoined the community in the 1990s, internal racial tensions continued to plague the sport on the local level.

Netball has a history of being televised, but printed media has also provided much positive coverage of the sport on national, international, provincial and school levels.

Apartheid
In the pre-Apartheid period, netball was commonly associated with wealthy whites. Netball was being played by African girls in schools by the early 1930s. Upper-class girls were discouraged from playing the sport because of its competitive nature, and were pushed into playing tennis instead.
Maximus Primary was a predominantly middle class Indian school located in Durban that largely followed the white model of schooling. Unlike many non-white schools of the time, it had outdoor facilities with changing rooms for netball, soccer and cricket.

In areas in and around Cape Town, netball was a favourite sport for coloured schools to have because it was the cheapest one to play. During the 1930s and 1940s, some coloured girls would play rugby. By the time they reached puberty, they were encouraged to start playing a more feminine game such as netball. Rates of sport participation were higher amongst non-Muslim coloured children than amongst Muslim coloured children. In 1940, the Bantu Inter-schools League in Johannesburg had 145 netball teams that shared ten courts. At the time, only 6.6% of black South African students attended school, so their participation in this netball league was small. Issues like hunger and inadequate housing coupled with lack of facilities and the distance to get to them discouraged young black South African girls from playing the sport. Secondary issues for black South African women regarding netball arose because of gender struggles in the black South African community; coloured men controlled most aspects of sport for coloured women, who were dependent on them for getting to use existing sport facilities or getting new facilities built. Despite these issues during the 1970s, 1980s and 1990s, some dedicated sportswomen worked hard for their sport by organising local leagues and inter-provisional competitions.

In the 1930s, South Africa was competing against the Silver Ferns both at home and in New Zealand. The South African government insisted that there be no Māori netball players at matches. The New Zealand government complied with this request. In 1956, an English team toured the country. It was their first touring side and all team members had to pay their own airfare. England won all three test matches. South Africa toured England for the first time in 1959. They played 25 matches against local English clubs side, winning 18 of them. They also played a three series against England's national team, where they lost every match. In 1966, the South African Schoolgirls team completed a 61 match tour of England; the South African side won every match. In 1967, a South African netball team toured New Zealand. This event was largely unnoticed on the international stage.  Prior to the 1967 tour starting, Prime Minister John Vorster and the South African government had discussions with the New Zealand government regarding the "Maori problem". Vorster later spoke at the 1969 Transvaal National Party congress. He demanded reform in regards to sport, and wanted to allow mixed race teams to compete inside South Africa.  At the same congress, Albert Hertzog opposed allowing racially mixed teams from abroad from competing in South Africa. He specifically spoke of the Maori and claimed that their inclusion on New Zealand touring sides would lead to South African acceptance of social integration. Albert Hertzog is quoted as saying:

The Prime Minister won the battle and mixed race teams were allowed to compete in South Africa. The strong history of sport competition between New Zealand and South Africa were one of the reasons the Broedrbond plan was passed in April 1971. The plan allowed mixed race teams from traditional national sporting competitors to play in the country, but they could not play mixed race South African teams. In 1969, South Africa's national netball association, Netball South Africa, was expelled from the international netball community because it was viewed as being a "white-only" organisation and South Africa was excluded from competing in the 1971 World Netball Tournament. South Africa's government tried to address this by allowing multi-cultural teams from abroad to compete in the country against racially segregated white and non-white teams. At the same time, the government affirmed that it would not tolerate integration of teams, nor allow non-white and white teams to compete against each other. In 1969, the All England Netball Association withdrew an invitation it had provided to South Africa to tour the country.  They did this because South Africa had indicated England could not choose a team regardless of the race of the player. In 1973, England received reassurances from the South African government that England could have a mixed race squad.  Because of this, England played a three-game test series against the South African Women's Netball association and a one-game test against the South African Coloured Board. The team also played twenty-one matches against local clubs. The English netball association hosted 55 coaching sessions during the tour.  Of these, 18 were for coloured girls, 3 were for Indians, one was for mixed and 33 were for whites. England's record against South Africa in international matched between 1949 and 1976 was seven wins, one loss. In 1974, the New Zealand Netball Association was approached by the New Zealand government regarding the possibility of South Africa being included in a 1975 international tournament. The government turned down this request because apartheid meant New Zealand's side could not be selected regardless of race. The government told the New Zealand Netball Association that it would oppose a visit by the South African national netball team. As a result of the English tour of South Africa, several countries including Jamaica banned players who participated from competing in netball matches in their country. In 1976, New Zealand declined a South Africa tour offer because the South African team was suspended from IFNA.

The South African Sports Association (SASA) was created in 1958. This organisation was for blacks-only sport. It had eight sport associations under its purview: athletics, cycling, cricket, soccer, weight-lifting, tennis, softball, baseball and netball. The total membership for all eight associations was 70,000.

In 1977, there were 517 white-only netball facilities in South Africa, with a ratio of 1:20,035 facilities to white persons, while there were 29 homelands netball facilities, with a facilities to population ratio of 1:310,443. In 1981, there were 104 netball fields compared to six cricket pitches and four athletics tracks in Greater Soweto. In 1982, the government claimed it was spending ten million rand to build blacks-only sporting facilities. Part of the ten million rand was going towards building 147 new netball courts. This announcement backfired in the international press, who saw it as another example of the South African government under-funding black sports and that it justified the continued boycott of South Africa in the international sport community. In 1988 in Pietermaritzburg, 65 practice fields for tennis, volleyball and netball were used by 11,567 white school children. By contrast, 13,000 coloured and Indian school children shared five practice fields. By 1993, there were open tensions regarding the inability of South Africa's netball team to compete internationally. Most of South Africa's national team members were white. This was despite the fact that many black South African women played netball.

There were well-educated blacks who were middle and upper class during the 1970s and 1980s.  One of the ways they tried to achieve success and greater acceptance in the white community was by participating in sports such as cricket, netball and rugby. When they did, they had to play using white standards of play.  If they were successful, the athletes were only compared to white athletes.

Post Apartheid
In the post-apartheid South Africa, blacks became more involved in leadership positions in South Africa, in areas like the National Olympic Committee of South Africa and in soccer. This was not the case with netball, which continued to be run by whites. During 1994, there were allegations of racism over the selection of players to the national squad. In 1995, the white only Stellenbosch had around fifteen netball courts and six hockey fields. A lack of a wider community identity hindered the ability of netball to racially integrate in the post-apartheid South Africa. In 1997, white women as participants still outnumbered their black South African counterparts. One of the sports contested is netball. Netball has a large spectator base composed of white women.

In the early and mid-1990s, South African netball received funds from Britain/South Africa Sports Initiative.  While most of the money was earmarked for general sport, South African netball was specifically address with the goal of improving netball coaching. Beyond that, general sport funding went to a developing certification process for sport administrators, general strategic development of sport, and transferring knowledge between different generations of sport administrators. In 1994, the national team had their first international tour after a 20-year absence from international competition.  The tour took place in and against New Zealand. The success of the South African Springboks in the 1995 Rugby World Cup had a positive impact on support for other South African national teams at international competitions, including the nation's appearance at the 1995 Netball World Championships. At the Netball World Championship, South Africa provided a major upset when they beat New Zealand in pool play. South Africa ended up losing to Australia in the finals. In 1995, the South African Police Service (SAPS) held its first National Netball Championships in Pretoria. The development of SAPS netball was not taken seriously until 1999 when they affiliated to Netball South Africa as an associated member. The Southern African Development Community has a sport competition with over 600 correctional officers from member countries participating. In 1996, South Africa lost three test matches against New Zealand. The 2000 national championships were held in Cape Town. In 2000, New Zealand's national side toured South Africa for the first time. The two countries played three test matches and New Zealand won them all. In 2001, a Tri-Nations Series was launched between Australia, New Zealand and South Africa.  The 2001 series was won by New Zealand.

In 2006, an effort was made to start a professional women's netball league. On 6 August 2007, Netball South Africa announced an incentive program to get member clubs to comply with racial quota requirements. Netball South Africa president Mimi Mthethwa was quoted as saying:

This policy was implemented because some teams had been punished with the loss of points for wins and losses, and frequently ended up having negative points for a season despite having won more games than they lost.

In the post apartheid South Africa, construction of new schools in poorer townships often failed to include the construction of both indoor and outdoor sporting facilities. There might be some space set aside for a netball court or a soccer field, though that may be the only substitute available. The problems of getting facilities for women's sports like netball is still difficult because of Zulu gender constructions, where men are the dominant cultural force. Some schools in coloured areas do not offer physical education classes. To address this need, they have school teams. Most schools only offer netball for girls, soccer for boys and athletics for both genders. For coloured children, boys rank sport as the most important for things to do in their free time. In contrast, coloured girls rank playing sport as fourth in their list of priorities.

In the post Apartheid South Africa, Afrikaners were not as worried about racial integration for netball and rugby as they were about the integration of their schools. In Afrikaner schools, teachers are expected to coach rugby or netball, or another sport on offer by the school. Soccer became the de facto sport of choice in South Africa. This was made possible because of the participation of women in the game, which enabled greater community support. Netball became more of a sport for working-class women.

International assistance
South Africa has made efforts to help develop the game around Africa. They have helped Botswana with coach and umpire development. 30 local graded umpires and 22 Botswana based coaches were trained in the country.

International performance

The table below contains some of South Africa results in international competitions.

|-
|2018||Commenwealth Games||

The table below contains some of South Africa results in individual international matches.

The table below includes information on former captains, vice captains and head coaches.

As of February 2020, the women's national team was ranked 5th in the world.

Men's involvement
There are a number of men's teams around the country and some national competitions like Action Sports Netball Inter Provincial Tournaments have categories for them to compete on mixed teams or men's only teams.

People
Irene van Dyk is a famous South African netball player. Many in the British press hailed her as having sex appeal that netball needed to grow internationally.

See also
 Sport in South Africa
 World University Netball Championship

References

Notes

Bibliography

External links 
Netball South Africa